Child harvesting or baby harvesting refers to the systematic sale of human children, typically for adoption by families in the developed world, but sometimes for other purposes, including trafficking. The term covers a wide variety of situations and degrees of economic, social, and physical coercion. Child harvesting programs or the locations at which they take place are sometimes referred to as baby factories or baby farms.

Markets
Child harvesting typically refers to situations where children are sold for adoption, but may also refer to situations in which children are trafficked to provide slave labor. It is particularly associated with and prevalent in some international adoption markets.

Infants who are trafficked are often eventually forced to work in plantations, mines and factories, as domestic workers or as sex workers. There have been a very few allegations of some child harvesting programs that provide infants to be tortured or sacrificed in black magic or witchcraft rituals. Nigerian security agents have uncovered a series of alleged baby factories in recent years, notably in the southeastern part of the country populated by the Igbos.

Human trafficking is widespread in west Africa, where children are bought from their families to work in plantations, mines and factories or as domestic help.

Others are sold into prostitution, and less commonly they are tortured or sacrificed in black magic rituals. Human trafficking, including selling children, is prohibited under Nigerian law (PDF), but almost 10 years ago a UNESCO report (PDF) on human trafficking in Nigeria identified the business as the country’s third-most common crime behind financial fraud and drug trafficking, and the situation certainly has not improved. At least 10 children are reportedly sold every day across the country.

Sources
Pregnant women may face economic or social duress, or, less commonly, outright coercion to give up their newborns. There are rare reports of women who are not yet pregnant being impregnated to produce infants for sale.

Baby farms have been reported in India, Nigeria, Guatemala, Thailand and Egypt.

Nigeria
Child harvesting in Nigeria is a subset of human trafficking. It often takes place in structures disguised as maternity homes, orphanages, clinics and small scale factories where pregnant girls live and deliver babies in return for monetary compensation. The trend is precipitated by various factors including a social premium placed on child bearing and social stigmas around infertility and teenage pregnancy. A black market for newly born babies has developed in parts of the country to provide infants to wealthy families who prefer cheaper clandestine methods as a substitute for surrogacy, in vitro fertilization, assisted reproductive technology or adoption through social services.

The majority of the women whose children are sold are young unmarried women from lower-income households who are scared of social stigmatization as a result of an unwanted teenage pregnancy. Some of the young girls come to the baby factory after searching for abortion clinics, though others have been kidnapped. Most of the discovered baby factories are found in Southern Nigeria with high incidence in Ondo, Ogun, Imo, Akwa Ibom Abia and Anambra.

The first publicly reported case of a baby factory was published by the United Nations Educational, Scientific and Cultural Organisation in 2006. In 2008, a network of baby factories claiming to be orphanages, was revealed in Enugu, Enugu State (Nigeria), by police raids. In 2011, Nigerian police raided two more hospitals, thereby dismantling two baby factories: in June, thirty-two pregnant women were found in Aba, Abia, in a hospital of The Cross Foundation; in October, seventeen pregnant women (thirty according to some sources) were found in Ihiala, Anambra, in a hospital of the Iheanyi Ezuma Foundation. Five more baby factories were discovered in 2013, and eight more were discovered in 2015. Infertile women are noted to be major patrons of these baby factories due to the stigmatization of childless couples in Southern Nigeria and issues around cultural acceptability of surrogacy and adoption. These practices have contributed to the growth in the industry which results in physical, psychological, and sexual violence to the victims.

Prevention 
Tackling baby factories will involve a multifaceted approach that includes advocacy and enacting of legislation barring baby factories and infant trafficking and harsh consequences for their patrons. Also, programs to educate young girls on preventing unwanted pregnancies are needed. Methods of improving awareness and acceptability of adoption and surrogacy and reducing the administrative and legal bottlenecks associated with these options for infertile couples should be explored to diminish the importance of baby factories

See also
 Child labour
 Child laundering
 Child-selling
 Child trafficking
 Commercial sexual exploitation of children
 Human trafficking in Nigeria
 Trafficking of children
 List of international adoption scandals
 Surrogacy
 Assisted reproductive technology
 Adoption

References

External links
 Baby factories: How pregnancies, deliveries are framed at Vanguard
 Video: The Nigerian Connection II (18:15-23:10) of Al Jazeera
 Baby factories in Nigeria: Starting the discussion toward a national prevention policy  in Trauma, Violence and Abuse Journal, July 2015.
 Baby factories taint surrogacy in Nigeria in Reproductive Biomedicine Online Journal, October, 2015
 Infant Trafficking and Baby Factories: A New Tale of Child Abuse in Nigeria in Child Abuse Review Journal, November 2015

Child abuse
Children's rights
Human trafficking
Human reproduction
Natalism